Yevgeni Aleksandrovich Bushmanov (born 2 November 1971) is a Russian football coach and a former player.

Playing career
He played for Shinnik Yaroslavl, Spartak Moscow, CSKA Moscow, Torpedo Moscow and Krylia Sovetov Samara. He played seven matches for Russia national football team and was a participant at the Euro 1996.

Coaching career
Since finishing his playing career, Bushmanov worked as a reserve team coach (first with Shinnik, then with Saturn).

After failing to pass the 2019 UEFA European Under-21 Championship qualification with Russia U-21, he left the team by mutual consent on 23 October 2018.

Honours
 European under-21 champion in 1990 with USSR
 Russian Premier League winner in 1992, 1998, 1999, 2000
 Soviet Cup winner in 1992

European club competitions
 European Cup 1990–91 with FC Spartak Moscow: 2 games (reached semi-final).
 UEFA Cup 1991–92 with FC Spartak Moscow: 2 games.
 UEFA Champions League 1992–93 with PFC CSKA Moscow: 9 games, 1 goal.
 UEFA Cup Winners' Cup 1994–95 with PFC CSKA Moscow: 1 game.
 UEFA Cup 1996–97 with PFC CSKA Moscow: 4 games.
 UEFA Intertoto Cup 1997 with FC Torpedo-Luzhniki Moscow: 4 games.
 UEFA Champions League 1998–99 with FC Spartak Moscow: 8 games.
 UEFA Champions League 1999–2000 with FC Spartak Moscow: 8 games.
 UEFA Cup 1999–2000 with FC Spartak Moscow: 2 games.
 UEFA Champions League 2000–01 with FC Spartak Moscow: 2 games.
 UEFA Intertoto Cup 2002 with FC Krylia Sovetov Samara: 4 games.

References

External links
 Profile at official site FC Saturn Moscow Oblast
 Profile at RussiaTeam 
 

1971 births
Living people
People from Tyumen
Soviet footballers
Soviet Union youth international footballers
Soviet Union under-21 international footballers
Russian footballers
Russia under-21 international footballers
Russia international footballers
Soviet Top League players
Russian Premier League players
FC Shinnik Yaroslavl players
FC Spartak Moscow players
PFC CSKA Moscow players
FC Torpedo Moscow players
FC Torpedo-2 players
PFC Krylia Sovetov Samara players
UEFA Euro 1996 players
Russian football managers
FC Khimki managers
Association football defenders
Sportspeople from Tyumen Oblast